PEDS Legwear, formerly known as Richelieu Legwear, is an international legwear company. It manufactures socks and hosiery.

History
The Simard family founded Richelieu Legwear in Sorel, Quebec in 1934. The family gained prominence in the region as shipbuilders and owners of Marine Industries Limited (M.I.L.). Richelieu grew to eventually employee over 600 people in Quebec at its peak in 2002. The Simards maintained ownership of Richelieu until 1997, when Harvey Penner a Montreal businessman who joined Richelieu in the 1960s as a sales manager bought out the Simards and became president of Richelieu Knitting. He remained with the company until 2006 when he sold the Richelieu Hosiery division to his son, Michael D. Penner, who is currently president and CEO.

The company suffered in the late 1990s and early 2000s, when unfavorable exchange rates, competition from China and other lower costs countries impacted the Canadian manufacturing industry. Like many other Canadian textile companies, Richelieu moved production off-shore or risk going bankrupt.

In 2011, PEDS Legwear invested $7 million to buy the assets of International Legwear Group (ILG), a failing sock company based in Burke County (Hildebran), North Carolina. The assets included the PEDS and MediPEDS brands In 2014, Richelieu Legwear changed its name to PEDS Legwear to better reflect its new main brand.

PEDS Legwear has offices in Montreal, Quebec; Hildebran, North Carolina; and Shanghai, China.

In 2007, Deloitte named Richelieu Hosiery as one of Canada's 50 best managed companies. In 2013, the Canadian Chamber of Commerce and Grant Thornton LLP named Richelieu Legwear as a finalist for the 2013 Private Business Growth Award.

In 2014, Peds announced it was investing $16 million and hiring 200 workers at its Hildebran location over a five-year period after a multi-year commitment from Walmart.

In June 2016, the Governor's Office and the North Carolina Department of Commerce announced the award of a $500,000 building reuse grant to Peds so it could expand the Hildebran location with the promise of adding 50 new jobs. Burke County and the town of Hildebran approved a 5 percent match to the state grant.

In 2016, Gildan Activewear announced its $55 million purchase of PEDS.

In 2018, Gildan Activewear Inc. announced its plans to close the operation in Hildebran and lay off all of its manufacturing and distribution workers.

US investment
With its investment in ILG, PEDS Legwear became part of the rebirth of the American manufacturing sector, which had sustained severe losses during the Great Recession, particularly in the textile industry. On March 11, 2015, the company opened a new $16 million manufacturing facility in Hildebran that is projected to create more than 205 jobs by 2018. This investment was part of the SelectUSA program of the US Department of Commerce. As a result, PEDS has been cited as an example of how foreign investment can save and create American manufacturing jobs. Penner was invited by President Barack Obama to talk about the company's investment at a roundtable meeting.

See also

List of sock manufacturers

References

External links

Clothing companies of Canada
Socks
Hosiery brands